Side Four is a live album by the artist Adrian Belew, originally released on November 16, 2007.

The album was recorded live at Canal Street Tavern in Dayton, Ohio on
February 16, 2007. The tracks "Dinosaur", "Three of a Perfect Pair" and "Thela Hun Ginjeet" were originally recorded by King Crimson.

The album features Belew performing with Julie Slick (bass guitar) and Eric Slick (drums), the two sibling musicians with whom he'd later form the Adrian Belew Power Trio.

Track listing
All songs written by Adrian Belew except where noted.
"Writing on the Wall" – 4:09
"Dinosaur" (Belew, Bill Bruford, Robert Fripp, Tony Levin, Pat Mastelotto, Trey Gunn) – 4:59
"Ampersand" – 4:39
"Young Lions" – 4:13
"Beat Box Guitar" – 11:07
"Matchless Man" – 4:49
"A Little Madness" – 6:07
"Drive" – 7:21
"Of Bow and Drum" – 4:45
"Big Electric Cat" – 3:44
Acknowledgements – :50
"Three of a Perfect Pair" (Belew, Bruford, Fripp, Levin) – 4:07
"Thela Hun Ginjeet" (Belew, Bruford, Fripp, Levin) – 6:11

Personnel

Musicians
 Adrian Belew – guitars, vocals
 Julie Slick – bass
 Eric Slick – drums
 Biff Blumfumgagne – backing vocals

Technical
 Adrian Belew – producer, artwork
 John Sinks – engineer
 Saul Zonana – mastering
 Julie Rust – layout
 Mark Colman – photography

References 

Adrian Belew albums
2007 live albums
Albums produced by Adrian Belew
Island Records live albums